Civilian Service Medal may refer to:

 Civilian Service Medal 1939–1945, awarded to civilians in Australia during World War II.
 Civilian Service Medal (Afghanistan), awarded by the British government to recognise service since 19 November 2001 in the transition to democracy in Afghanistan.